The 2012–13 Danish Cup is the 59th season of the Danish Cup competition. It is the second season since its rebranding as the DBU Pokalen (The DBU Cup). The winner of the competition will qualify for the play-off round of the 2013–14 UEFA Europa League.

Overview

 From regional qualification

First round
96 teams were drawn into the first round - 16 teams from the First Division, 32 teams from the Second Divisions and 48 clubs from regional qualification. Matches were played on 14-16 and 22 August 2012.

Second round
The teams who finished in positions 5–10 in last season's Superliga and the two promoted teams from last season's First Division entered the competition in the second round. The matches were played on 28–29 August, 4, 11–12 September.

Third round
The teams who finished in positions 1–4 in last season's Superliga entered the competition in the third round. The matches were played on 25–26 September, 3 and 24 October.

Fourth round
The matches are being played on 31 October, 1, 7 and 8 November.

|}

Quarter-finals

Semi-finals

First Legs

Second Legs

Final

References

External links
 

Danish Cup seasons
Danish Cup
Cup